Saint Mary at Stoke is a Grade I listed Anglican church in the Old Stoke area of Ipswich. on the junction of Stoke Street and Belstead Road in Ipswich, Suffolk.

The church stands in a prominent position near the foot of a ridge, just south west of Stoke Bridge and the town centre. Its parish was a small farming community which saw a great increase in population with the coming of the railway to this part of Ipswich. It was once governed by Ely, a fact lightly made much of by a politician of Stoke. 
In 1995 its parish was subsumed into the South West Ipswich Team Ministry in the Diocese of St Edmundsbury and Ipswich.

The building is made up of a small medieval church and a large Victorian extension designed by William Butterfield in 1872. A church has existed on this site since the 10th Century. It is probably one of the St Marys mentioned in the Domesday Book.

The original nave (now the north aisle) has a medieval single hammer beam roof, with moulded wall plates, angels with shields at the ends of the hammer beams, and figures underneath. The angels are Victorian replacements for those destroyed by iconoclasts. The church was visited by William Dowsing. There is a medieval piscina.

Richard Hall Gower is buried in a vault of the church.

References

Church of England church buildings in Ipswich
Grade I listed churches in Ipswich
William Butterfield buildings